Herbert Weichert (born 24 July 1937) is a German sailor. He competed in the Star event at the 1972 Summer Olympics.

References

External links
 

1937 births
Living people
German male sailors (sport)
Olympic sailors of East Germany
Sailors at the 1972 Summer Olympics – Star
People from Opole County